Escadrille Spa.155 (originally Escadrille N.155) was a French fighter squadron active from 12 July 1917 through the end of World War I on 11 November 1917. Refitted with SPADs and renamed Escadrille Spa.155, it was bundled into the larger Groupe de Combat 18 in January 1918. The squadron campaigned with the Groupe as it supported several field armies during mid-1918. The squadron was Mentioned in dispatches on 4 October 1918. By war's end Escadrille Spa.155 was credited with the destruction of 13 enemy airplanes and an observation balloon.

History

Escadrille N.155 was established with Nieuport XXIV aircraft on 12 July 1917 at Montdesir, France. The squadron was updated to Nieuport XXVII fighters in November, then re-equipped with SPADs the next month. The latter change caused a squadron renaming to Escadrille Spa.155.

In late January 1918, the squadron was one of four banded into Groupe de Combat 18. The Groupe, including Escadrille Spa.155, operated in support of half a dozen French field armies during mid-1918. In early September 1918, it was tasked to the American 1st Army for the Battle of Saint-Mihiel. In the aftermath of the Saint-Mihiel offensive, the Groupe moved to support IV Armee on 24 September 1918. That was its last move of the war.

On 4 October 1918, the squadron was Mentioned in dispatches. Escadrille Spa.155 was credited with destroying 12 enemy airplanes and an observation balloon.

Commanding officers

 Lieutenant Edmond George: 12 July 1917 - 27 October 1918
 Lieutenant Labitte: 27 October 1918 - 8 November 1918
 Lieutenant Rondot: 8 November 1918

Notable member

 Sous lieutenant René Pelissier

Aircraft

 Nieuport XXIV:17 July 1917 - November 1017
 Nieuport XXVII: November - December 1917
 SPADs: December 1917 onwards

End notes

Reference
 Franks, Norman; Bailey, Frank (1993). Over the Front: The Complete Record of the Fighter Aces and Units of the United States and French Air Services, 1914–1918 London, UK: Grub Street Publishing. .

Fighter squadrons of the French Air and Space Force
Military units and formations established in 1917
Military units and formations disestablished in 1918
Military units and formations of France in World War I
Military aviation units and formations in World War I